Osvald Chlubna (July 22, 1893 in Brno – October 30, 1971 in Brno) was a prominent Czech composer. Intending originally to study engineering, Chlubna switched his major and from 1914 to 1924, he studied composition with Leoš Janáček. Until 1953, he worked as a clerk. Later, he taught at the Organ School in Brno for many years. He worked in many art organisations in Brno. Chlubna's works can be defined by three distinct periods: Romanticism, Impressionism, all the way to the Modern Constructivism. He delved into Symbolism as well. He used the texts of symbolic Czech poets, such as Otakar Březina, Jaroslav Vrchlický, Jaroslav Durych and others. He wrote several cycles of compositions for piano and organ, as well as instrumental concerts, symphonies, ouvertures and cantatas. He wrote many operas, often using his own librettos, such as The Revenge of Catullus based on the work of Vrchlický (1917), Alladina and Palomid (based on the work of Maeterlinck, 1925), Ňura (1932), How the Death came in the World (1936), Jiří from Kunštát and Poděbrady (based on the work of Alois Jirásek, 1941), Cradle (composed on the work of Jirásek, 1951), Eupyros (1960). He also wrote texts and articles primarily about Janáček.

Selected works 
Opera
 Pomsta Catullova (The Revenge of Catullus), 1 Act (1917); libretto by the composer based on the work of Jaroslav Vrchlický
 Alladina a Palomid (Alladina and Palomid), 3 Acts (1922); libretto by the composer based on the work of Maurice Maeterlinck
 Ňura, 2 Acts (1930); libretto by O. Dymov
 Jak smrt přišla do světa (How Death Came into the World) (1936); libretto by the composer
 Freje pána z Heslova (The Friar of Heslov), 4 Acts (1939–1940); libretto by F. L. Stroupežnichký
 Jiří z Kunštátu a Poděbrad (Jiří from Kunštát and Poděbrady), 3 Acts (1941–1942); libretto by the composer based on the work of Alois Jirásek
 Kolébka (The Cradle), 3 Acts (1951–1952); libretto by the composer based on the work of Alois Jirásek
 Eupyros, 3 Acts (1960–1962); libretto by the composer

Ballet
 Hrátky na drátkách (1955); libretto by the composer

Orchestra
 Karneval podzimu (Winter Carneval), Op.82
 Portály a fresky brněnské
 Symphony No.3 "Osudová" (1960)
 To je má zem (This is My Country), Cycle of Symphonic Poems for Orchestra
 Brněnské kašny a fontány, Op.86 (1963)
 Propast Macocha, Op.87
 Hrad Pernštejn, Op.88
 Ej chlapci, hore!, Op.90
 Veseloherní předehra (Comedy Overture)

Band
 Pochod sportovců

Concertante
 Andante for Violin and Small Orchestra
 Fantasie in C Minor for Viola and Orchestra, Op.44 (1936)
 Concerto for Violin and Orchestra, Op.75

Chamber
 Elegie ztracených lidí (Elegy of Lost Peoples) for Cello and Piano (1924)
 Fantasie for violin and viola, Op.71 (1949)
 Invence (Invention) for Viola Solo (1962)
 Sonata for Violin and Cello, Op.22 (1925)
 Sonata for Violin and Piano, Op.66 (1948)
 Sonatina for Viola and Piano, Op.119
 String Quartet in C Major, Op.26
 String Quartet No.3 in E, Op.35 (1933)
 String Quartet No.5, Op.114
 Suita instruktivní for Violin and Piano

Piano
 Nokturna (Nocturnes), Cycle of Moods, Op.36 (1933)
 Preludium, toccata a fuga, Op.37
 Sonáta-fantazie, Op.93

Organ
 Allegro feroce
 Passacaglia, Op.41

Choral
 Já, potulný šumař, Cantata
 Je krásná země má, Lyric Cantata for Chorus and Orchestra; text by F. Halas, A. Sova
 Ve jménu života, Cantata for Chorus and Orchestra, Op.94

Vocal
 Melancholické serenády o lásce (Melancholic Serenades of Love) for Voice and Piano, Op.62

References 
 Hudební Informační Středisko

1893 births
1971 deaths
Musicians from Brno
People from the Margraviate of Moravia
Czech classical composers
Czech male classical composers
Czech opera composers
Male opera composers
20th-century classical composers
Pupils of Leoš Janáček
20th-century Czech male musicians